Xenon is a 1988 vertical scrolling shooter video game, the first developed by The Bitmap Brothers, and published by Melbourne House which was then owned by Mastertronic. It was featured as a play-by-phone game on the Saturday-morning kids' show Get Fresh.

Xenon was followed in 1989 by Xenon 2: Megablast.

Description

According to the game's instruction manual, the player assumes the role of Darrian, a future space pilot in the Federation, currently at war with a mysterious and violent alien species called the Xenites that has lasted a decade. In response to a mayday transmission from Captain Xod following an attack on his trading fleet, Darrian is forced to travel through Xenite-occupied territory in order to support.

Unlike most vertically scrolling shooters, the player craft has two modes, a flying plane and a ground tank. The transition between crafts can be initiated at almost any time during play (except during the mid- and end-of-level boss sections, as well as certain levels where a certain mode is forced), and the mode chosen depends on the nature of the threat the player faces. Destroying some enemies released power-ups the player could catch to enhance their ship.

Ports
Originally released for the Atari ST, Xenon was quickly ported to other platforms: the Amiga, Amstrad CPC, Commodore 64, DOS, MSX and ZX Spectrum.
An arcade machine version of the game was also released through Mastertronic's Arcadia division which ran on Commodore Amiga hardware.

Reception
Xenon was almost universally well-received on launch, with reviewers from magazines covering a range of platforms all scoring the game very highly. Only German magazine Power Play bucked the trend, awarding it a score of 4.5 out of 10.

Writing in New Computer Express about the 1991 budget re-release, Stuart Campbell stated that although the graphics were "gorgeous" and had "never really been seen before", the gameplay was "simply tedious" and the game was the first to "turn 'style-over-content' into an artform".

References

External links 
 
 
 
 

1988 video games
Amiga games
Amstrad CPC games
Arcade video games
Atari ST games
Commodore 64 games
DOS games
MSX games
NEC PC-9801 games
ZX Spectrum games
Vertically scrolling shooters
Video games scored by David Whittaker
Video games developed in the United Kingdom
Science fiction video games
Single-player video games
The Bitmap Brothers games